Brydan Klein and Dane Propoggia are the defending champions but chose to defend their title with different partners. Klein partnered Bradley Mousley and lost in the semifinals to Gerard and Marcel Granollers. Propoggia partnered Vijay Sundar Prashanth but lost in the first round to Andrew Harris and Luke Saville.

Granollers and Granollers won the title after defeating Evan King and Max Schnur 7–6(10–8), 6–2 in the final.

Seeds

Draw

References
 Main Draw

Burnie International - Men's Doubles
2018 Men's Doubles